Junior Albertus (born 25 December 1996) is a Dutch footballer who plays as a forward for Dutch club HVV Tubantia.

Playing career

Club career
After brief stints in the Vitesse and N.E.C. youth systems, Albertus found early success at Feyenoord, making his U19 team debut at the age of 16.

In May 2015, he signed with FC Emmen, and spent the rest of the 2014/15 season with their U19 team. He was called up to the first team in July, but did not end up signing a professional contract because he was deemed overweight at the first team training session. Instead, he signed with local fourth division club WKE. In his only season at WKE, he scored 8 goals in 19 matches.

Albertus was released from his contract (along with the rest of his teammates) in early 2016 after the club went bankrupt and dropped out of the league. He initially signed a contract with semi-pro club Kozakken Boys in March. However, after noticing his weight loss, he was bought back by FC Emmen in May, taking advantage of a clause in the Kozakken contract allowing them to offer him a more lucrative contract. He made his professional debut on 12 August 2016, during a 1-0 victory over RKC Waalwijk. He came on as a 78' sub for Issa Kallon.

International career
Albertus earned two caps with the Netherlands national under-18 team in 2013 during a four-team friendly tournament in Turkey. He came off the bench in matches against Turkey and Czech Republic.

References

External links

 
 Junior Albertus profile at SoccerPunter
 

Living people
1996 births
Curaçao emigrants to the Netherlands
People from Willemstad
Dutch footballers
Association football forwards
WKE players
FC Emmen players
HHC Hardenberg players
Sparta Nijkerk players
Eerste Divisie players
Tweede Divisie players
Derde Divisie players
Vierde Divisie players
Netherlands youth international footballers
SBV Vitesse players
NEC Nijmegen players
Feyenoord players
HVV Tubantia players